The following are the national records in athletics in Chile maintained by its national athletics federation: Federación Atlética de Chile (FEDACHI).

Outdoor

Key to tables:

+ = en route to a longer distance

h = hand timing

A = affected by altitude

# = not recognised by federation

OT = oversized track (> 200m in circumference)

Men

Women

Indoor

Men

Women

Notes

References
General
Chilean Outdoor Records – Men 30 December 2020 updated
Chilean Outdoor Records – Women 31 December 2019 updated
Chilean Indoor Records 2 February 2020 updated
Specific

External links
FEDACHI web site

Chile
Records
Athletics
Athletics